Nova is a Bangladeshi rock band formed in Dhaka in 1986 by Ahmed Fazal. The band rose to prominence in the early 1990s, establishing themselves in Bangladesh. They were one of the most influential bands of that time.

The name of the first album of the band is, Ahoban. The album's call song became very popular then. This anti-drug song received a special award from the government at that time. The second album features a number of lyrical songs. One of them was a song titled "Rajakarer Talika Chai". The song is sung in the style of Pink Floyd's song Another Brick in the Wall. All songs by Nova, except for Didi Jai of Vaiso album and the songs of the mixed albums, are written and composed by Ahmed Fazal. The band went into a hiatus in the 2000s but made a comeback with the album "Return of the Nova" released in 2010.

Their leader, frontman and lead vocalist Ahmed Fazal has released one solo album, titled, "পাশবিক" (Brutal) in 2014. He wears a white head-band in public and while performing, which had become a mod throughout Bangladesh in the 90s. Their ex-vocalist, Shakil Khan was inactive in music, since 1991, after leaving the band. In 2016, he released his solo album, titled "বছর পর" (pronunciation: Bachara para).

Discography

 "আহবান (Invitation)" (1989)
 "রাজাকারের তালিকা চাই ([We] Want a List of Rajakars)" (1990)
 "স্কুল পলাতক মেয়ে (School Runaway Girl)" (1993)
 "ভাইসো (Float)" (1996)
 "Nova'99 (নোভা'৯৯)" (1999)
 "ঠিকানা (Address)" (2002)
 "Return of the Nova (নোভার প্রত্যাবর্তন)" (2010)
 "একটি বেকার (An Unemployed)" (TBA)

Mixed albums
 "Stars 2 [স্টার্স ২] (তারকারা ২)"
 "আড্ডা (Adda)"
 "শক্তি (Strength)"
 "প্রেম (Love)"
 "শান্তি (Peace)"
 "ঘৃণা (Hatred)"
 "ক্ষমা (Forgiveness)"
 "ব্যথা (Pain)"
 "শেষ দেখা (Last Meeting)"
 "নেই তুমি (You are Not [Here])"
 "একা উদাসী মনে(Alone in Unconcerned Mood)"
 "ওরা এগার জন (They are Eleven)"

Members
Members of the band are as follows:

Current members
 Ahmed Fazal - lead vocals, lead guitar, bass guitar, keyboards, rhythm programming, composition, lyrics
 Noor - bass guitar
 Apu - keyboards
 Souren - lead guitar, back vocals
 Murad - drums

Past members
 Shakil Khan - vocals
 Valo - bass guitar, vocals
 Tolo - keyboards, vocals
 Moy - drums
 Charu - bass guitar
 Pappu - keyboards
 Zafar - manager, guitar
 SRee - drummer, vocals
 Rana - drums
 Ruzvelt - keyboards
 Rubel - drums
 Imran
 Antony Samiul Mashooq
 Lukan - drums
 Sumon - lead guitar

Nova first line-up
 Ahmed Fazal - lead vocals, lead guitar, bass guitar, keyboards, composition, lyrics
 Valo - bass guitar, vocals
 Tolo - keyboards, vocals
 Moy - drums
 Shakil - vocals
 Zafar - manager, guitar

References

External links

1985 establishments in Bangladesh
Musical groups established in 1985
Bangladeshi psychedelic rock music groups
Bangladeshi hard rock musical groups
Bangladeshi progressive rock groups